Hawk Films was a British film production company formed by American filmmaker Stanley Kubrick to produce his 1964 film Dr. Strangelove. Kubrick also used it as a production company for his later films A Clockwork Orange (1971), Barry Lyndon (1975), The Shining (1980), and Full Metal Jacket (1987).

Kubrick later formed two subsidiaries that were also named after birds of prey: Peregrine Productions was involved in the production of Barry Lyndon and The Shining, while Harrier Films was involved in Full Metal Jacket, together with his main production company Stanley Kubrick Productions, which formed to produce 2001: A Space Odyssey and was also the main production company for Kubrick's final film Eyes Wide Shut (1999).

American environmentalist Roger A. Caras served as vice president of Hawk Films from 1965 to 1969, and was involved in the promotion of 2001: A Space Odyssey.

References

Film production companies of the United Kingdom
Mass media companies established in 1964
1964 establishments in the United Kingdom